North on South St. is a hip-hop influenced album by Herb Alpert released in 1991 and his last vinyl release on A&M Records before he released Midnight Sun (available on CD and cassette only) in 1992. The album was a commercial success and produced two singles: "Jump Street" and "North on South St." Both of the singles had a video, yet "North on South St." got a bit of popularity because the video was featured on Beavis and Butt-head several years later.  There was a promotional plastic compass that was created as a marketing advertisement piece to commemorate the album release.

Track listing
 "Jump Street" (Greg Smith, Herb Alpert)
 "It's the Last Dance" (Herb Alpert, Greg Smith)
 "Passion Lady" (Troy Staton, Herb Alpert, Marc Jay Goodman, Mike Schlesinger)
 "North on South St." (Herb Alpert, Greg Smith)
 "Paradise 25" (Robert Jerald, Herb Alpert)
 "Na Na Na" (Greg Smith, Herb Alpert)
 "Funky Reggae" (Jimmy B, Herb Alpert)
 "Where's Tommy?" (Herb Alpert, Jimmy B, Eddie Del Barrio)
 "City Terrace" (Herb Alpert, Greg Smith)
 "I Can't Stop Thinking About You" (Herb Alpert)

Critical reception 
Shelly Weiss of Cashbox praised the album as “the tightest, most finely crafted quality album I've heard all year… across-the-board appeal, and will get the street crowd as well as the yuppies..”

Personnel
Herb Alpert – trumpet, vocals
Greg Smith – keyboards, programming, sampling
 Marc Jay Goodman – keyboards
 Joe Rotondi – piano
 Kenny McCloud – guitar
Eddie Del Barrio – bass guitar, keyboards
 Anthony Sapp – bass guitar
 Kevin Ricard – percussion

References

1992 albums
Herb Alpert albums
Albums produced by Herb Alpert
A&M Records albums
Universal Music Group albums
Albums recorded at A&M Studios